Eddy Geovani Vega Acosta (born 13 August 1980 on the island of Roatán) is a Honduran footballer who currently plays for Honduran second division side Honduras Progreso.

Club career
Nicknamed el Animal due to his hot temper, Vega started his professional career at Platense and also played for Hispano before moving abroad to join Guatemalans Coatepeque. He returned to Platense after a year but left them for  Real España in summer 2010. In 2011, he crossed the border again and signed for Zacapa in Guatemala.

In April 2013, when playing for Honduras Progreso, he was mistakenly reported by various media to be found killed near San Pedro Sula. He then did claim to have survived a car accident in March 2010.

International career
Vega was a non-playing squad member at the 2005 CONCACAF Gold Cup and made his debut for Honduras in a September 2005 friendly match against Japan, which proved to be his sole international game.

References

External links
 

1980 births
Living people
People from Roatán
Association football forwards
Honduran footballers
Honduras international footballers
2005 CONCACAF Gold Cup players
Platense F.C. players
Hispano players
Real C.D. España players
Deportivo Zacapa players
Liga Nacional de Fútbol Profesional de Honduras players
Honduran expatriate footballers
Expatriate footballers in Guatemala